Pseudostella is a genus of moths of the family Erebidae. The genus was erected by George Hampson in 1926.

Species
Pseudostella cyanolepia Kaye, 1907
Pseudostella oenone Schaus
Pseudostella pegasis Schaus, 1912

References

Calpinae